In North Macedonia, the standard time is Central European Time (CET; UTC+01:00). Daylight saving time is observed from the last Sunday in March (02:00 CET) to the last Sunday in October (03:00 CEST). This is shared with several other EU member states.

History 
North Macedonia observed daylight saving time between 1941 and 1945, and again since 1983 (by this time part of Yugoslavia).

IANA time zone database 
In the IANA time zone database, North Macedonia is given one zone in the file zone.tab – Europe/Skopje. Data for North Macedonia directly from zone.tab of the IANA time zone database; columns marked with * are the columns from zone.tab itself:

See also 
Time in Europe
List of time zones by country
List of time zones by UTC offset

References

External links 
Current time in North Macedonia at Time.is